Ghostbusters firehouse may refer to:
Firehouse, Hook & Ladder Company 8, the New York firehouse used as the exterior of the Ghostbusters' base in the Ghostbusters films
Fire Station No. 23 (Los Angeles, California), the Los Angeles firehouse used for interior scenes of the films